was an armed struggle between the Ainu and Wajin that took place on the Oshima Peninsula of southern Hokkaidō, Japan, in 1457. Escalating out of a dispute over the purchase of a sword, Koshamain and his followers sacked , before being overcome by superior forces under Takeda Nobuhiro. The principal record of the conflict is Shinra no Kiroku.

See also
 Shakushain's revolt
 Menashi-Kunashir rebellion

References

Ainu history
History of Hokkaido
Conflicts in 1457
15th century in Japan